The 1893–94 Sheffield Shield season was the second season of the Sheffield Shield, the domestic first-class cricket competition of Australia. The season took place between 15 December 1893 to 7 March 1894 and was contested by three teams. The competition would be won by South Australia who won three of their four matches. George Giffen scored the most runs in the competition with 526 runs while Charles Turner took the most wickets with 30.

Table

Notes:
 The order of the table was determined by the number of matches won by each team.

Pld: matches played; W: won; L: lost

Source:

Fixtures

Statistics

Most Runs
George Giffen scored the most runs for the 1893–94 season with 526 runs from eight innings which included 205 runs in the first innings of the game between South Australia and New South Wales at the Adelaide Oval. The remaining top three run scorers were also South Australians with Jack Lyons and Jack Reedman finishing second and third respectively.

Most wickets
Charlie Turner took the most wickets for the 1893–94 season with 30 wickets from his three matches which two 10-wicket matches, both of them against New South Wales. Second place was Charlie McLeod from South Australia while Andrew Newell finished third as he recorded the best figures of the season against South Australia at the Adelaide Oval.

References

Sheffield Shield
Sheffield Shield
Sheffield Shield seasons